
Year 441 BC was a year of the pre-Julian Roman calendar. At the time, it was known as the Year of the Consulship of Fusus and Crassus (or, less frequently, year 313 Ab urbe condita). The denomination 441 BC for this year has been used since the early medieval period, when the Anno Domini calendar era became the prevalent method in Europe for naming years.

Events 
 By place 
 China 
 Zhou ai wang becomes King of the Zhou Dynasty of China but dies before the year's end, to be succeeded by Zhou si wang.

 By topic 
 Literature 
 The Greek playwright, Euripides, wins his first victory in a dramatic festival.
 The Greek playwright Sophocles writes Antigone.

Births

Deaths 
 King Zhending of Zhou, 28th King of the Zhou dynasty of China
King Ai of Zhou, 29th King of the Zhou Dynasty of China
King Si of Zhou, 30th King of the Zhou Dynasty of China

References